World Wonder Ring Stardom is a Japanese professional wrestling promotion founded in 2010. During the years, the promotion has held various notable pay-per-view events which feature professional wrestling matches that resulted from scripted storylines, where wrestlers portrayed villains, heroes, or less distinguishable characters in the scripted events that built tension and culminated in a wrestling match or series of matches.

Annual tournaments

Past events

2018

2019

2020

2021

2022

2023

Upcoming events

Shared events

New Japan Pro Wrestling

Starting with 2020, Stardom began organizing exhibition matches as part of various events promoted by New Japan Pro Wrestling in order for female talent to be promoted in men's federations. The bouts are preponderantly scripted as tag team matches in which Stardom's wrestlers (who compete as part of certain stables) are usually shuffled. NJPW and Stardom held their first co-promoted event on November 20, 2022.

Hana Kimura Matane events
The Hana Kimura memorial shows are independent events produced annually by Kyoko Kimura to commemorate the death of her late daughter Hana who committed suicide on May 23, 2020. Various wrestlers from Stardom take part in these events, especially former members of Tokyo Cyber Squad or Oedo Tai, two of the units Kimura leaded in the past.
{| class="wikitable" style="font-size:85%;"
!Event
!Date
!Location
!Venue
!Match
!Ref
|-
| Hana Kimura Memorial Show || May 23, 2021 || rowspan=3|Tokyo, Japan || rowspan=3|Korakuen Hall || Asuka, Syuri, Natsupoi, and Mio Momono vs. Oedo Tai (Kagetsu and Hazuki) and Tokyo Cyber Squad (Konami and Death Yama-san) || 
|-
| rowspan="2" | Hana Kimura Memorial Show 2 || rowspan="2" | May 23, 2022 || Rina vs. Sakura Hirota || rowspan="2" |<ref>{{cite web|url=https://www.fite.tv/watch/hana-kimura-memorial-baugs/2pbb2/|title=Hana Kimura Memorial "Baugs!"|work=fite.tv|author=FITE TV|date=May 11, 2022|access-date=May 13, 2022}}</ref>
|-
|Syuri vs. Asuka
|}

See also
 List of World Wonder Ring Stardom personnel''

References

External links

  
  (English)

World Wonder Ring Stardom
World Wonder Ring Stardom shows
Women's professional wrestling shows
2020 in professional wrestling
2021 in professional wrestling
2022 in professional wrestling
2023 in professional wrestling
Professional wrestling-related lists